Snežana Paunović (born January 1, 1975) is a Serbian politician. She began her second term in the National Assembly of Serbia in 2016 as a member of the Socialist Party of Serbia (SPS). As of October 2022, she is the leader of the SPS parliamentary group.

Early life and career
Paunović was born to a Serb family in Peć, Socialist Autonomous Province of Kosovo, in what was then the Socialist Republic of Serbia in the Socialist Federal Republic of Yugoslavia. She continues to reside in the city, in the now-disputed territory recognized by Serbia as the province of Kosovo and Metohija. She is a graduate economist and has been on the supervisory board of the Belgrade Nikola Tesla Airport, a position that she left in 2015.

Political career
Paunović is a member of the main board of the Socialist Party of Serbia and the presidency of its women's forum.

She received the 180th position on the party's electoral list for the 2007 Serbian parliamentary election. The party won sixteen seats, and she was not subsequently chosen to serve in its assembly delegation. (From 2000 to 2011, Serbian parliamentary mandates were awarded to sponsoring parties or coalitions rather than to individual candidates, and it was common practice for mandates to be awarded out of numerical order. Paunović could have received a mandate despite her low position on the list – which was mostly alphabetical – but, in the event, she did not.)

In June 2010, Paunović was appointed by the Serbian government as co-ordinator for the Serb community in the municipality of Dečani. In 2012, she and other Kosovo Serb officials took part in negotiations with Serbian president Tomislav Nikolić on the future of the disputed territory and the status of its Serb community.

Serbia's electoral system was reformed in 2011, such that parliamentary mandates were awarded in numerical order to candidates on successful lists. Paunović received the fifty-seventh position on the Socialist Party's list and, as the list won forty-four mandates, was not immediately elected. She was, however, awarded a mandate on October 24, 2013, as a replacement for Neđo Jovanović, who had resigned to take a government position. The Socialist Party formed a coalition government with the Serbian Progressive Party after the 2012 election, and Paunović served as part of its parliamentary majority during her brief first term in office. The assembly was dissolved in early 2014, and she was not a candidate in the 2014 election.

Paunović received the twenty-first position on the Socialist Party's electoral list in the 2016 parliamentary election as was returned for a second term when the list won twenty-nine mandates. The Socialists continued their alliance with the Progressive Party and remained in government after the election. Paunović is currently a member of the assembly's culture and information committee, a deputy member of the committee on the diaspora and Serbs in the region, the committee on Kosovo-Metohija and the committee on the economy, regional development, trade, tourism and energy, and a member of the parliamentary friendship groups with Australia, Belarus, Belgium, Croatia, Cuba, Kazakhstan, Russia, Spain, Switzerland and the United Arab Emirates.

References

1975 births
Living people
Politicians from Peja
Kosovo Serbs
Members of the National Assembly (Serbia)
Socialist Party of Serbia politicians